The 1960–61 Drexel Dragons men's basketball team represented Drexel Institute of Technology during the 1960–61 men's basketball season. The Dragons, led by 9th year head coach Samuel Cozen, played their home games at Sayre High School and were members of the College–Southern division of the Middle Atlantic Conferences (MAC).

The team finished the season 12–5, and finished in 1st place in the MAC in the regular season.

Due to a power outage in Collegeville, Pennsylvania, the last 5 minutes and 10 seconds of Drexel's game at Ursinus on February 25, 1961, was not played.

On February 8, 1961, Samuel Cozen recorded his 100th win as Drexel head coach.

Roster

Schedule

|-
!colspan=9 style="background:#F8B800; color:#002663;"| Regular season
|-

|-
!colspan=9 style="background:#F8B800; color:#002663;"| 1961 Middle Atlantic Conference men's basketball tournament

References

Drexel Dragons men's basketball seasons
Drexel
1960 in sports in Pennsylvania
1961 in sports in Pennsylvania